Flint Engine Operations (previously, Flint Engine South) is a General Motors automobile engine factory in Flint, Michigan. The plant opened in 2002 and is named to replace the Flint North engine plant. The plant produces the small four-cylinder GM Family 0 engine ("FamZero") and GM High Feature engines. The factory receives cast engine blocks from Defiance Foundry in Defiance, Ohio and Saginaw Metal Casting Operations in Saginaw, Michigan. It replaced Flint North.

On September 25, 2008, GM announced a $370 million investment to build another engine plant at the Flint South complex.  The new plant was designed to produce the FamZero for the Chevrolet Cruze and Volt models beginning in 2010.

Previously, Flint Engine South produced inline six cylinder versions of the GM Atlas engine until that engine line was discontinued.

Products
 1.5L SGE Turbo I4
 3.0L Duramax turbodiesel I6

Product Applications
As of September 2022:
 Chevrolet Malibu
 Chevrolet Silverado
 Chevrolet Suburban
 Chevrolet Tahoe
 GMC Sierra
 GMC Yukon
 GMC Yukon XL
 Cadillac Escalade
 Cadillac Escalade ESV

References

External links 
 

General Motors factories
Economy of Flint, Michigan
Motor vehicle assembly plants in Michigan
Buildings and structures in Flint, Michigan
2000 establishments in Michigan